Sławka may refer to the following places in Poland:

Sławka Mała
Sławka Wielka